The Toachi River is a river of Ecuador. It is located a few hours from Quito and is the country's most popular river for rafting.

See also
List of rivers of Ecuador

References

 Water Resources Assessment of Ecuador

Rivers of Ecuador